The fourth season of the television series HaShminiya was originally broadcast on Arutz HaYeladim (HOT) in Israel.

Season overview
The fourth season (unofficially known as HaShminiya: The Next Generation) starts seven years after the end of Season 3. After receiving a mail from Avner HaLevy, saying that their memory was wiped. He also tells that he couldn't wipe the memory of his own son, Adam, and that he lived all-alone until he died, though it is suspected that he was murdered. He tells the remain seven - Natascha, Roni, Dori, Nini, Aya, Mika and Avi - that they have a mission - they have to find and train all-new six teenagers - Raphael, Hagar, Yotam, Gilli, Dennis and Leia.
Tamar and Yaron Dvir, Aya and Nini's siblings, are seven years old, and are home-schooled by tablets and LSRs - and Avshalom, the new villain, using their lamda for his new corporation - "Good Thoughts cop.". This corporation has very few workers - and apparently, Nitzan is one of them.

New characters

The New Shminiya
Refael Ashuri (Or Taragan) - Athlete kindness, hiding a major weakness. A hearing, smell and sight back, for example, he could see there handkerchief over his eyes, can hear and smell remotely. Member of Hagar.
Lia Kidron (Daria Shezif) -  funny side of the pack. Has the ability to change the image.
Dennis Geller (Din Mroshnicob) -  H"aaotsiidr "silent, game changer. Hacker and criminal. Living in the Hall of cell "in the desert, because looking after him. Five crystallized from the location and joins them. Having the ability to detect lies.
 Hagar Sasson (Amit Yafur) -  homecoming queen, hides a dark side. Spoiled and north. Has the ability to predict future contact. Love Rafael and finally becomes to be his girlfriend.
Yotam weirz (Ben Rebian) - geek. Finds himself did not believe that there are forces. Having the ability to heal itself. 
 Gili Porat (Noam Lugasi) - Kind and in love with Rafael. She has the ability to be invisible.

Supporting characters
Yaron Dvir (Itamar Karmeli) - Daddy and son of Deganit. Bob's twin brother, and the brother of Noa, Aya Ben - Ben. Joins the group after all the other six with his sister. Having the ability to read minds.
Tamar Dvir (Aviv Buchler) - Daddy and daughter of Deganit. Yaron's twin sister, and the sister of Aya, Nini and Ben Ben. Joins all the other six-pack along with her brother. Capable of mind reading.
 Naama (Yamit Sol) - works council services. Partner of Omri. After exemptions Omri, being appointed deputy Yair. Omri makes her dismissal and kills her later.
Chamutal (Noah Koller) - Real Estate Agent Council, mites, addicted to sweets. Naama's personal assistant.
Absalom (Yuval Yanai) - the bad guy in the new season. Nitzan and Daddy work for him. Plan to use Blmda to get people to choose the prime minister

Episodes

{| class="wikitable plainrowheaders" style="width:100%; margin:auto; background:#FFFFFF;"
|-
! style="background-color: #800080; color:#FFF; text-align: center;" width="35"|Series# 
!! style="background-color: #800080; color:#FFF; text-align: center;" width="35"|Season# 
!! style="background-color: #800080; color:#FFF; text-align: center;"|Title
!! style="background-color: #800080; color:#FFF; text-align: center;" width="140"|Original airdate

|}

2013 Israeli television seasons